Jason Robert Ward (born January 16, 1979) is a Canadian former professional ice hockey right winger. He has played 336 games in the National Hockey League (NHL) with the Montreal Canadiens, New York Rangers, Los Angeles Kings, and Tampa Bay Lightning. He was born in Chapleau, Ontario.

Playing career
Ward was drafted 11th overall by the Montreal Canadiens in the 1997 NHL Entry Draft. He played 186 career NHL games with the Montreal Canadiens, the New York Rangers and the Los Angeles Kings, scoring 20 goals and 28 assists for 48 points. When he was traded to the Kings, the deal sent agitator Sean Avery to the Rangers providing them boost for a playoff push. On February 27, 2007, he was traded to the Tampa Bay Lightning in exchange for a fifth round pick in the 2007 NHL Entry Draft, making the third time he was traded during the 2006–07 season. He scored his first Lightning goal in his debut with the team.

After completing the 2009–10 season in the American Hockey League with Philadelphia Flyers affiliate, the Adirondack Phantoms, Ward was unable to garner a new NHL contract for the following 2010–11 season. In order to maintain game shape, Ward voluntarily took on a position as an assistant coach for major junior team the Brampton Battalion of the Ontario Hockey League while on the lookout for a new contract. On November 15, 2010, Ward signed a one-year contract and played his last professional season with Austrian team, EHC Black Wings Linz, of the EBEL.

Ward has the distinction of scoring his first NHL goal, in his first NHL game, on his first NHL shot, all three milestones coming at Madison Square Garden against the Mike Richter and the New York Rangers on December 3, 1999

Career statistics

Regular season and playoffs

International

References

External links

1979 births
Living people
Adirondack Phantoms players
Canadian expatriate ice hockey players in Austria
Canadian ice hockey right wingers
EHC Black Wings Linz players
Erie Otters players
Fredericton Canadiens players
Hamilton Bulldogs (AHL) players
Ice hockey people from Ontario
Los Angeles Kings players
Montreal Canadiens draft picks
Montreal Canadiens players
National Hockey League first-round draft picks
New York Rangers players
Niagara Falls Thunder players
Norfolk Admirals players
People from Chapleau, Ontario
Plymouth Whalers players
Quebec Citadelles players
Tampa Bay Lightning players
Windsor Spitfires players